Boise Airport  (Boise Air Terminal or Gowen Field) is a joint civil-military airport in the western United States,  south of downtown Boise in Ada County, Idaho. The airport is operated by the city of Boise Department of Aviation and is overseen by an airport commission. It is the busiest airport in the state of Idaho, serving more passengers than all other Idaho airports combined and roughly ten times as many passengers as Idaho's second busiest airport, Idaho Falls Regional Airport.

Boise is a landing rights airfield requiring international general aviation flights to receive permission from a Customs and Border Protection officer before landing.

In addition to being a commercial and general aviation airport, Boise also functions concurrently as a USAF military facility as used by the 124th Fighter Wing (124 FW) of the Idaho Air National Guard on the Gowen Field Air National Guard Base portion of the airport. The 124 FW operates the A-10 Thunderbolt II aircraft.

The National Interagency Fire Center is based in the city of Boise and the Boise Airport is used for logistical support. The United States Forest Service (USFS) also uses Boise Airport as a base for aerial firefighting air tankers during the wildfire season.

Boise Airport enplaned 2,059,935 passengers in 2019, an increase of 6% vs. 2018 when 1,938,416 passengers were enplaned (making it the 69th busiest airport in the country).

Terminals and development 
Boise Airport currently has one terminal with two concourses and servicing nine airlines. The terminal is a three-story building containing four baggage carousels, rental car counters, all of the ticketing counters, a consolidated security checkpoint including TSA pre check and CLEAR Security, and some offices.

The two concourses have a combined 24 gates with 13 total jet bridges. Concourse B has 13 gates and 11 jet bridges (with one jet bridge serving each of B21 a/b and B22a/b). Airline gate assignments are broken down as follows: B10, B11, B21a/b (United), B15, B17 (Southwest), B14, B16, B19 (Common Use), B18 (American), B20, B22a/b (Delta). The Common use gates are used as follows: B14 (United, Delta), B16 (Allegiant, southwest), B19 (American, Avelo, Spirit). Concourse C serves Alaska Airlines and has 11 gates; however, only gates C8a and C12 are equipped with jet bridges, with the rest having covered walkways.

Construction

In 2016, Boise Airport released a new master plan outlining their short, medium, and long-term plans. Each of these terms would mark different stages of the airport's growth and renewal, with the largest projects being three new parking garages, upgrades to Concourse B, and a new Concourse A.

Concourse A

The new Concourse A would sit on the other side of the main terminal from concourses B and C. Long terms for the airport call for ten new gates, all equipped with jet bridges. One of the new gates would be equipped to handle wide bodied aircraft, five equipped for narrowbody aircraft, and four equipped for regional jets up to an A220. Phase 1 of the new concourse is scheduled to begin construction by the end of 2022 and will include six gates, three for mainline aircraft and three for regional aircraft. The makeup of Phases 2 and 3 would depend on the needs of the airport and have not been determined yet.

Parking garages

Increasing passenger traffic at BOI requires the addition of parking. To this end, the airport is building three new parking garages. One will be a public garage for passengers with 940 spaces. This will be built on an existing surface lot. The other two garages, an employee garage and a rental car center garage, are being relocated to make room for Concourse A. The new employee garage will have 680 spaces and the rental car garage will have 880 spaces.
The airport has begun construction on its first two of the three parking garages. In late January 2022, it broke ground on the construction for the new employee parking garage after several delays, and its new public parking garage expansion. Both these projects plan to be finished by the end of 2023. The airport also plans to break ground on a new 2 part rental car garage in 2023, this will make room for the new Concourse A.

History
Boise's first municipal airport, Booth Field, was built in 1926 on a gravel bed near the south bank of the Boise River, now the campus of Boise State University. The first commercial airmail flight in the United States passed through this airfield on April 26, 1926, carried by Varney Airlines. Varney began operating out of Boise in 1933, later merging with National Air Transport to become United Airlines. Less than four months after his historic transatlantic flight, the airfield hosted Charles Lindbergh and the Spirit of St. Louis 

The current airport has its origins in 1936 when Boise began buying and leasing land for the airport. The steel hangar for Varney Airlines was moved to the present field in 1939. As aircraft grew the hangar was no longer big enough and was converted into a passenger terminal. It was part of the modern terminal facility until the completion of a new terminal in 2004.

During World War II, the U.S. Army Air Forces leased the field for use as a training base for B-17 Flying Fortress and B-24 Liberator bomber crews. More than six thousand men were stationed there during the war.

The field was named Gowen Field in 1941 on July 23, after 1st Lt Paul R. Gowen. Born and raised in Caldwell, he attended the University of Idaho for two years, then obtained an appointment to West Point in 1929, and graduated ninth in his class in 1933. While piloting a twin-engine B-10 bomber in the Army Air Corps, Gowen was killed instantly in a crash in Panama in July 1938. The right engine failed shortly after take-off from Albrook Field, near Panama City. The other two crew members, navigator and radio operator, survived and crawled from the wreckage with burns.

After the war the part of the field used by the Army Air Forces was returned to the city. The Idaho Air National Guard began leasing the airfield after the war and continues to do so at the present time.

Jet service
The jet age arrived in Boise during the mid-1960s. In 1966, United Airlines was operating Boeing 727-100 jetliners into the airport with round trip routings of Boise (BOI)-Salt Lake City (SLC)-Chicago (O'Hare, ORD)-Boston (BOS) and Seattle (SEA)-Portland (PDX)-Boise (BOI)-Salt Lake City (SLC)-Denver (Stapleton, DEN)-Chicago (ORD)-New York (Newark, EWR). United was also serving the airport with Douglas DC-6 and DC-6B propliners at this time. West Coast Airlines introduced Douglas DC-9-10 jet service during the late 1960s and in 1968 was operating round trip routings of Seattle (Boeing Field, BFI)-Portland (PDX)-Boise (BOI)-Salt Lake City (SLC) and Portland (PDX)-Seattle (BFI)-Boise (BOI)-Salt Lake City (SLC)  West Coast was also serving Boise with Fairchild F-27 turboprops and Douglas DC-3 prop aircraft in 1968. The same year West Coast merged with Bonanza Air Lines and Pacific Air Lines to form Air West which was subsequently renamed Hughes Airwest which in turn continued to serve Boise with Douglas DC-9 (-10, -30) jets. In 1972, Hughes Airwest was operating nonstop DC-9 service from Boise to Portland and Salt Lake City and was also flying direct (no change of plane) DC-9 service to Los Angeles (LAX), Las Vegas (LAS), Phoenix (PHX), San Diego (SAN), Burbank (BUR), Santa Ana (SNA), Spokane (GEG) and other regional destinations.

By 1976, Hughes Airwest and United were still the only two airlines operating jet service into Boise according to the Official Airline Guide (OAG). United had also expanded its Boise service by this time and was operating nonstop flights with Boeing 727 (-100, -200) and larger Douglas DC-8 jetliners to Chicago (O'Hare), Denver (Stapleton), Portland, Salt Lake City, San Francisco, Seattle, Reno, and Spokane as well as direct, no change of plane jet service to New York (LaGuardia), Los Angeles, Boston, Washington, D.C (National), San Diego, and Hartford, according to the Official Airline Guide (OAG). United and Hughes Airwest were operating all of their flights into Boise with jet aircraft at this time in 1976.  Also according to the OAG, in early 1985 Cascade Airways was operating international service of a sorts into Boise with a direct flight once a week from Calgary via intermediate stops in Spokane and Lewiston, ID.

Following the federal Airline Deregulation Act of 1978, a number of air carriers operated jet service into the airport at different times over the years from the late 1970s through the 1990s. The following list of airlines is taken from OAG editions from 1979 to 1999:

 Alaska Airlines (mainline jet service)
 America West Airlines
 Cascade Airways
 Continental Airlines
 Frontier Airlines (1950-1986)
 Horizon Air
 Morris Air
 Mountain West Airlines 
 Northwest Airlines

 Pacific Express
 Pacific Southwest Airlines (PSA)
 Republic Airlines (1979-1986) (acquired Hughes Airwest in 1980)
 Sunworld International Airways (operating as Sunworld Airlines)
 United Express operated by Air Wisconsin
 US Airways 
 Western Airlines
 Wien Air Alaska

Between 2001 and 2005, Boise Airport was remodeled with a new terminal and an elevated roadway for departures, constructed in two phases. Phase 1 considered amenities such as baggage claim, lobby, and food and beverage concession, which were completed in 2003. Phase 2 dealt with security checkpoints and a new concourse (Concourse C) and the remodeling of Concourse B, which were completed in 2005.

The Boise Airport Passenger Terminal designed by CSHQA is a three-story, steel-framed  state-of-the-art aviation facility. Curvilinear, steel trusses create the undulating ceiling plane of the ticket lobby and define the signature profile of the building. The terminal has garnered national attention for the beauty of its design and is considered a prototypical post-9/11 facility.

The Boise Airport was fourth in passenger satisfaction in the J.D. Power and Associates 2004 Global Airport Satisfaction Index Study. Power no longer publishes a global listing, and the airport was not listed in the 2017 North American ranking.

The Boise Airport was a hub for Horizon Air from the late 1980s to the early 2000s. Horizon Air was acquired by the Alaska Air Group, the parent company of Alaska Airlines, in 1986 and began code sharing flights for Alaska Airlines at that time. During the summer of 1990, Horizon Air was operating up to 36 departures a day from the airport to destinations in Idaho, Oregon, and Washington, as well as direct one stop service to Salt Lake City. By 1999, Horizon Air was operating up to 22 departures a day from Boise with Fokker F28 Fellowship jets with additional flights being operated with de Havilland Canada DHC-8 Dash 8 turboprops. The regional airline also previously operated Dornier 328, Fairchild F-27, and Swearingen Metroliner propjets. Boise is currently a focus city for Alaska Airlines service operated by both Horizon Air and code sharing partner SkyWest Airlines.

Boise was also one of the primary destinations served by Cascade Airways which competed with Horizon Air. In 1985, Cascade was serving the airport with British Aircraft Corporation BAC One-Eleven jets and Swearingen Metroliner propjets with regional service in Idaho, Oregon, Washington, and Montana, as well as nonstop jet service to Reno, Nevada, and connecting flights to Canada at Calgary, Alberta.

Facilities
It has three runways:

 10L/28R: 10,000 x 150 feet (3,048 x 46 m), asphalt, weight capacity: /single wheel; VASI system
 10R/28L: 9,763 x 150 feet (2,976 x 46 m), asphalt, weight capacity: /single wheel; VASI, ILS/DME
 09/27: 5,000 x 90 feet (1,524 x 27 m), asphalt, weight capacity: unspecified; restrictions: military only

In the year ending January 1, 2019, the airport had 137,459 aircraft operations, average 376 per day: 49% general aviation, 36% airline, 7% air taxi, and 8% military. 269 aircraft were then based at this airport: 147 single-engine, 22 multi-engine, 37 jet, 17 helicopter and 46 military. Of the top 100 United States airports, BOI is among four airports that does not charge a PFC.

The airport can handle minor maintenance and repairs through fixed-base operators Jackson Jet Center, Turbo Air and Western Aircraft.

Law enforcement is handled by the Boise Police Department. In 2006, the Airport Division had an authorized strength of 1 lieutenant, 2 sergeants, and 28 officers, and there were five TSA certified K-9 units trained in explosive detection.

The north–south runway (offset slightly northeast) was aligned with present-day S. Zeppelin Street (approximately with Owyhee Street to the north), and the east–west runway was offset slightly southwest. The intersection point of the two former runways was on today's main taxiway, near the terminal. The second parallel runway (10L/28R) was extended  to the east in 1998.

ATC tower

In 2008, city officials broke ground for Boise Air Terminal's a new airport traffic control tower, the latest facilities improvement. The tower's height at  made it the tallest building in the state of Idaho until it was surpassed by the Zions Bank Idaho Headquarters Building in 2013  and the Northwest's tallest control tower. It was relocated to the south side of the airport in order to control an existing Guard assault strip, runway 09/27, south of Gowen Field. The tower was planned and constructed when it was believed that the radar functions would be moved to Salt Lake City in Utah. After it was decided to leave the radar positions in Boise, the facility at the base of the tower was redesigned and partially remodeled to house the Terminal Radar Approach Control (TRACON).

The tower and TRACON opened on September 16, 2013, with updated electronics and equipment, including the STARS radar system; improving services and safety for pilots and the flying public. With the expanded facilities and new equipment, the TRACON operates the approach control for Boise Airport, and also remotely operates the approach control for the Bozeman Airport in Montana. The TRACON was then renamed Big Sky Approach to reflect the broader geographical coverage. The consolidation of Boise and Bozeman approach control facilities into Big Sky Approach is part of the FAA's continuing plan to consolidate approach control services across the nation. Boise's TRACON was designed with the option of adding additional radar scopes, and may offer approach control services to other airports in the future.

Gowen Field Air National Guard Base

Gowen Field Air National Guard Base primarily refers to the military facilities on the south side of the runways, which includes Air National Guard, Army National Guard, and reserve units of the Army, Navy, and Marine Corps. The field is home to the 124th Fighter Wing (124 FW), Idaho Air National Guard, which consists of one flying squadron operationally-gained by the Air Combat Command (ACC) and 12 additional support units. The aircraft based at Gowen Field ANGB is the A-10 Thunderbolt II close air support attack aircraft of the 190th Fighter Squadron (190 FS).

The 124 FW was previously designated as the 124th Wing (124 WG), a composite Air Combat Command (ACC) and Air Mobility Command (AMC) unit that also operated C-130H Hercules transport aircraft in the 189th Airlift Squadron (189 AS), the 189 AS being operationally-gained by AMC.

BRAC 2005 directed that the Idaho Air National Guard divest itself of the C-130 mission by 2009, transferring its C-130s to the Wyoming Air National Guard, while retaining its A-10 fighter mission. This action was completed in 2009 and the 124 WG was redesignated the 124 FW at that time. The 124 FW is composed of over 1000 military personnel, consisting of just over 300 full-time Active Guard and Reserve (AGR) and Air Reserve Technician (ART) personnel and over 700 traditional part-time Air National Guardsmen.

First responder training area
In February 2011, FedEx donated a surplus Boeing 727-200 cargo jet (tail number N275FE) to the City of Boise for use as a training tool for emergency first responders. The aircraft—stripped of engines—is parked near the southeastern end of Boise's third runway—a location more than a mile southeast of, and not visible from, the main passenger terminal. Several agencies use the plane for training purposes.

Airlines and destinations

Passenger

Cargo

Statistics

Top destinations

Airline market share

Annual traffic

Accidents and incidents
A naval aviator and Vietnam War veteran, the pilot bailed out at low altitude, but his parachute failed to deploy, and he was killed.
The corporate jet of Morrison–Knudsen was returning from Billings, Montana, where four passengers were dropped off. No passengers were on board at the time of the crash, more than an hour after sunset, which killed both experienced pilots.
On August 1, 1974, a Douglas B-26B (N91354) and a Beechcraft M24R (N2529W) collided on the ground while both were taxiing. The pilot of the light plane was killed, crushed under the bomber after the bomber's nose gear collapsed. The B-26 had just arrived from Twin Falls, over an hour prior to sunset, and was headed for the Boise Interagency Fire Center; badly burned, its pilot was airlifted to Salt Lake City, but succumbed three days later.
On November 16, 1991, a Cessna 402B (N29517) lost power in its starboard engine shortly after take-off from runway 10L, attempted to return, and crashed a mile (1.6 km) south of the airport, killing the pilot and his daughter, the only passenger. Bound for Pocatello, the air taxi cargo flight occurred over four hours prior to sunrise on Saturday.
On December 9, 1996, a Douglas C-47A (N75142) of Emery Worldwide crashed on approach to runway 28(L/R), killing the only two crew members on board. The aircraft was on a cargo flight to Salt Lake City after sunset when the starboard engine caught fire shortly after take-off from runway 10L and the decision was made to return to Boise.
On February 3, 2012, a Lancair IV-PT turboprop (N321LC) flown by Steve Appleton, CEO of Micron Technology, crashed shortly after take-off from runway 10R, killing the pilot. Attempting an emergency landing, Appleton had aborted an earlier take-off attempt for unknown  the accident was attributed to pilot error.

References

External links

Historic American Engineering Record (HAER) documentation, filed under Boise, Ada County, ID:

1936 establishments in Idaho
Airports established in 1936
Airports in Idaho
Buildings and structures in Boise, Idaho
Historic American Engineering Record in Idaho
Transportation in Ada County, Idaho